Regime change is the partly forcible or coercive replacement of one government regime with another. Regime change may replace all or part of the state's most critical leadership system, administrative apparatus, or bureaucracy. Regime change may occur through domestic processes, such as  revolution, coup, or reconstruction of government following state failure or civil war. It can also be imposed on a country by foreign actors through invasion, overt or covert interventions, or coercive diplomacy. Regime change may entail the construction of new institutions, the restoration of old institutions, and the promotion of new ideologies.

According to a dataset by Alexander Downes, 120 leaders were removed through foreign-imposed regime change between 1816 and 2011.

Types

Internal regime change
Regime change can be precipitated by revolution or a coup d'état. For example, the French revolution, the Russian revolution, and the Iranian revolution.

Foreign-imposed regime change
Foreign-imposed regime change is the deposing of a regime by a foreign state, which can be achieved through covert means or by direct military action. Interstate war can also culminate into a foreign-imposed regime change for the losers, as occurred for the Axis Powers in 1945. Foreign-imposed regime change is sometimes used by states as a foreign policy tool. According to a dataset by Alexander Downes, 120 leaders have been successfully removed through foreign-imposed regime change between 1816 and 2011.

During the Cold War, the United States frequently intervened in elections and engaged in attempts at regime change, both covertly and overtly. According to Michael Poznansky, covert regime change became more common when non-intervention was codified into international law, leading states that wanted to engage in regime change to do so covertly and conceal their violations of international law.

Regime promotion 
According to John Owen IV, there are four historical waves of forcible regime promotion:

 Catholicism vs Protestantism: From the 1520s to the early 18th century
 Republicanism vs Constitutional monarchy vs Absolute monarchy: From the 1770s to the late 19th century
 Communism vs Liberalism vs Fascism: From the late 1910s to the 1980s
 Secular government vs Islamism: post-1990

Impact 
Studies by Alexander Downes, Lindsey O'Rourke and Jonathan Monten indicate that foreign-imposed regime change seldom reduces the likelihood of civil war, violent removal of the newly imposed leader, and the probability of conflict between the intervening state and its adversaries, as well as does not increase the likelihood of democratization (unless regime change comes with pro-democratic institutional changes in countries with favorable conditions for democracy). Downes argues,The strategic impulse to forcibly oust antagonistic or non-compliant regimes overlooks two key facts. First, the act of overthrowing a foreign government sometimes causes its military to disintegrate, sending thousands of armed men into the countryside where they often wage an insurgency against the intervener. Second, externally-imposed leaders face a domestic audience in addition to an external one, and the two typically want different things. These divergent preferences place imposed leaders in a quandary: taking actions that please one invariably alienates the other. Regime change thus drives a wedge between external patrons and their domestic protégés or between protégés and their people. Research by Nigel Lo, Barry Hashimoto, and Dan Reiter has contrasting findings, as they find that interstate "peace following wars last longer when the war ends in foreign-imposed regime change." However, research by Reiter and Goran Peic finds that foreign-imposed regime change can raise the probability of civil war.

By country 

 Russian involvement in regime change
Soviet involvement in regime change
 United States involvement in regime change
 United States involvement in regime change in Latin America

See also
 Active measures (in Soviet Union and Russia)
 Color revolution
 Covert operations
Debt jubilee
 History of the Central Intelligence Agency
 Peaceful transition of power
 Rollback
 State collapse

References

Further reading

External links
 Encarta Dictionary
 Word Spy: Regime Change

1925 introductions
1920s neologisms
Causes of war
Aftermath of war
Changes in political power
Revolution terminology